Den svenske disco is the first full-length release by the synthpop group Slagsmålsklubben. The track list features the Swedish names as well as the names translated to English.

Track listing
 "Övningsköra" – 3:19 (Driving Practice)
 "Tjeckien, Slovakien och tillbaks igen" – 4:16 (The Czech Republic, Slovakia and Back Again)
 "Wellington Sears" – 3:34
 "Vi och Olle" – 2:34 (We and Olle)
 "Kinematografen" – 1:29 (The Cinematograph)
 "Svenska tennis" – 2:10 (The Swedish Tennis)
 "Hit Me Hard" – 2:54
 "Rörmokarhäng" – 3:17 (Plumber's Sag)
 "USSR" – 3:35
 "SMK hittar munspelet" – 3:15 (SMK Finds the Harmonica)
 "I Don't Miss You Rävbur" – 2:36 (I Don't Miss You Fox Cage)
 "Stora farliga rymdprojektet går åt pipan" – 3:19 (The Big Dangerous Space Project Goes Awry)

References

2003 albums
Slagsmålsklubben albums